Kirstine "Paprika" Steen (born 3 November 1964) is a Danish actress and director best known for her performances in Dogme 95 films Festen, The Idiots, Mifune, and Open Hearts. Steen was the first Danish actress since Karin Nellemose in 1994 to win both Best Actress (for Okay) and Best Supporting Actress (Open Hearts) in the same year at the Robert Festival, the Danish equivalent of the Oscars.

Biography

Steen was born on 3 November 1964 in Frederiksberg, Denmark, the daughter of musician and conductor  and the actress Avi Sagild. She is the sister of musician and actor . Steen applied to the Acting School of Odense Theatre 13 times before being accepted and attending from 1988 to 1992. Steen performed on stage in Dr. Dante productions and been associated with the Royal Danish Theatre since 1997. In 1997 she wrote and performed in the satirical television series  Lex og Klatten. In 1998, Steen became an active participant in the Dogme 95 film movement as the only performer to appear in the first three movies: Lars Von Trier's The Idiots, Festen by Thomas Vinterberg, and Søren Kragh-Jacobsen's Mifune's Last Song.

Steen won her first Bodil Award as the Best Supporting Actress in 2000 for Den eneste ene (The One and Only). In 2002, Steen won the Bodil Award, Robert Award and American Film Institute's Grand Jury Prize for her leading role as the controlling loudmouth Nete in Okay. The same year she also won both the Bodil and Robert awards as Best Supporting Actress in Elsker dig for evigt (Open Hearts).

Steen made her directorial debut in with the 2004 tragedy-drama Lad de små børn... (Aftermath) about the emotional trauma of a young couple after the death of their daughter. The film received awards at several film festivals including the Lübeck Nordic Film Days and the Film by the Sea International Festival. In 2007, Steen directed her second feature, the comedy film .

Steen is married to producer .

Filmography

Actress
 (1988)
Black Harvest (1993)
 (1993)
Frække Frida og de frygtløse spioner (1994)
 (1994)
 (1995)
The Biggest Heroes (1996)
 (1997)
Festen (1998)
Kirikou and the Sorceress (1998) (Danish dub)
The Idiots (1998)
 (1999)
The One and Only (1999)
 (1999)
Mifune (1999)
Max (2000)
Help! I'm a Fish (2000)
 (2001)
Okay (2002)
Open Hearts (2002)
 (2002)
Stealing Rembrandt (2003)
De drabbade (2003)
Adam's Apples (2005)
 (2006)
Vikaren (2007)
Fear Me Not (2008)
Applause (2009)
Everything Will Be Fine (2010)
Skeletons (2010)
SuperClásico (2011)
Keep the Lights On (2012)
Love Is All You Need (2013)
Silent Heart (2014)
 (2016)
 (2016)
Modus Séries 2 (2017)
Below the Surface (2017)
The City and the City (2018)
Domino (2019)

Director
Aftermath (DK, 2004)
 (DK, 2007)
That Time of Year (2018)
Fædre & mødre (2022)

References

External links

Paprika Steen reviewed in the New York Times For Her Performance in Applause (2010)

1965 births
Best Supporting Actress Bodil Award winners
Danish actresses
Danish film directors
Danish people of American descent
Danish women film directors
Living people
People from Frederiksberg
Best Actress Robert Award winners